Dronino may refer to:
Dronino meteorite, an iron meteorite found in Russia in 2000
Dronino (Ryazan), a village in Ryazan oblast, Russia